Micracanthorhynchina is a genus of worms belonging to the family Rhadinorhynchidae.

Species

Species:

Micracanthorhynchina atherinomori Smales, 2014
 Micracanthorhynchina chandrai Bhattacharya, 2007
 Micracanthorhynchina cynoglossi Wang, 1980
 Micracanthorhynchina dakusuiensis (Harada, 1938)
 Micracanthorhynchina golvani Gupta & Sinha, 1992
 Micracanthorhynchina hemiculturus Demshin, 1965
 Micracanthorhynchina hemirhamphi (Baylis, 1944)
 Micracanthorhynchina indica Farooqi, 1980
 Micracanthorhynchina kuwaitensis Amin & Sey, 1996
 Micracanthorhynchina lateolabracis Wang, 1980
 Micracanthorhynchina motomurai (Harada, 1935)
 Micracanthorhynchina segmentata

 Micracanthorhynchina atherinomori Smales, 2014
 Micracanthorhynchina chandrai Bhattacharya, 2007
 Micracanthorhynchina cynoglossi Wang, 1980
 Micracanthorhynchina dakusuiensis (Harada, 1938)
 Micracanthorhynchina golvani Gupta & Sinha, 1992
 Micracanthorhynchina hemiculturus Demshin, 1965
 Micracanthorhynchina hemirhamphi (Baylis, 1944)
 Micracanthorhynchina indica Farooqi, 1980
 Micracanthorhynchina kuwaitensis Amin & Sey, 1996
 Micracanthorhynchina lateolabracis Wang, 1980
 Micracanthorhynchina motomurai (Harada, 1935)
 Micracanthorhynchina segmentata(Yamaguti, 1959)

References

Rhadinorhynchidae
Acanthocephala genera